Stanley Malin (1878-1903) was an Australian rules footballer who played with Port Adelaide in the SANFL.

Malin usually played across the half forward line or in the centre and played for Port Adelaide in 1898 and 1899. He won the Magarey Medal in 1899,  making him the first Port Adelaide player to ever win the award.

In 1900 he left the club and moved to Sydney in order to study medicine. At the age of 25 he died after a brief illness in 1903.

References

External links

1878 births
1903 deaths
Port Adelaide Football Club (SANFL) players
Port Adelaide Football Club players (all competitions)
Magarey Medal winners
Australian rules footballers from South Australia